Marija Vujović (Montenegrin Cyrillic: Марија Вујовић) (born 19 May 1984 in Titograd, Yugoslavia, now Podgorica, Montenegro) is a Montenegrin model born in Yugoslavia. 

She was discovered by Elite Model Management in her home town after friends talked her into participating and shot to fame at the Dries Van Noten show in Paris in 2002.
She has been featured in campaigns for a Dolce & Gabbana fragrance and Yves Saint Laurent's Rive Gauche. In 2006, Dolce & Gabbana cast Vujović in their Light Blue fragrance adverts that were shot by photographer Mario Testino in Capri. The commercial received 11 million online views, and according to British researchers, is among the sexiest television adverts ever made.

Vujović was photographed by Steven Meisel for the Dolce & Gabbana campaign, by Mert & Marcus for Bulgari Eyewear and by Michael Thompson for RMK.  She has also walked the catwalk for designers such as Calvin Klein, Donna Karan, and Gucci. Vujović walked in both the 2005 and 2007 Victoria's Secret fashion shows.

It was once falsely reported that she was related to the former President of Montenegro, Filip Vujanović. Actually, they are in no way related, as reported by the local media outlets. 

She admires music and the stage: she studied classical piano for seven years at the Conservatory and has also taken acting lessons. She speaks both English and Serbian language, worked as a model in Serbia, in Belgrade, also in Montenegro as a model.

References

External links
IMG Profile

Living people
1984 births
People from Podgorica
Montenegrin female models
21st-century Montenegrin people
21st-century Montenegrin women
20th-century Montenegrin people
20th-century Montenegrin women